Märtini Brös (aka Maertini Broes) is a German indietronic dance musical duo from Berlin, who have toured extensively throughout Europe and overseas. The project is a collaboration between DJ Clé (born in East Berlin) and Mike Vamp (born in Frankfurt). Both became established on the electronic music scene in Berlin during the 1980s and 1990s as Djs and remixers. The duo first worked together in 1997 at the Berlin nightclub E-Werk as part of an effort to translate the opera Don Giovanni into an electronic version.

Their sound incorporates techno and house combined with lyrics sung in German and English. As a live act the band usually performs with sequencers and electric guitars.

Remixes

Märtini Brös (aka Maertini Broes) have provided remixes for numerous artists; the most significant include Missy Queen's Gonna Die by Tok Tok with Soffy O, Bleib Geschmeidig by 2raumwohnung and Filthy and Georgeous by Scissor Sisters. Tiga has used several tracks on his progressive house compilations on Turbo Recordings, including DJ-Kicks.

Discography

Singles and EPs

Albums

References

 Discogs biography

External links
  Official Site
 Maertini Broes on Soundcloud

Electronic music duos
German electronic music groups
German electronic musicians
German musical duos
Remixers